Joseph Richard Brennan (1908–1949) was an Australian rugby league footballer who played in the 1930s.

Career
Brennan was the elder brother of Len Brennan who also played for St. George and was a schoolboy GPS sprint champion.  Brennan played with the Saints for four seasons from 1931 to 1934. 

He played one season with Souths in 1936 before retiring from rugby league.

Death
Brennan died from accidental tetanus poisoning in Griffith, New South Wales on 23 June 1949.

References

St. George Dragons players
South Sydney Rabbitohs players
Rugby league wingers
Australian rugby league players
1908 births
1949 deaths